Project Chatter was a United States Navy program beginning in the fall of 1947 focusing on the identification and testing of drugs in interrogations and the recruitment of agents. Their search included laboratory experiments on both animal and human subjects. The program operated under the direction of Charles Savage of the Naval Medical Research Institute, Bethesda, Maryland, from 1947 to 1953. The project was geared to identifying agents both synthetic and natural that were effective during interrogation. The project was centered on, but not restricted to, the use of anabasine (an alkaloid), scopolamine and mescaline. The program ended shortly after the Korean War in 1953.

See also
MKUltra
Project Artichoke
Unethical human experimentation in the United States

References

Central Intelligence Agency operations
Psychedelic drug research
Mind control
1947 establishments in the United States
1953 disestablishments in the United States
Code names
Human subject research in the United States